Judith A Turnbull (born 1947), is a female retired swimmer who competed for England.

Swimming career
Turnbull became a National champion at the ASA National British Championships when she won the 220 yards medley title in 1966.

She represented England in the 440 yards medley event, at the 1966 British Empire and Commonwealth Games in Kingston, Jamaica.

References

1947 births
English female swimmers
Swimmers at the 1966 British Empire and Commonwealth Games
Living people
Commonwealth Games competitors for England
20th-century English women